Walter Watts (17 June 1872 – 9 July 1946) was an Australian sportsman, best known as the oldest player to have played a senior game in the West Australian Football League (WAFL).

Born in Adelaide, South Australia, in 1872, Watts moved to Fremantle, Western Australia, in the 1890s, representing both the Imperials Football Club, and a number of Fremantle representative cricket teams which played against touring Victorian and Australian sides. Watts later moved to Midland Junction, where he worked as a blacksmith for the Midland Railway of Western Australia at the Midland Railway Workshops. He was a foundation member of the Midland First Grade cricket team (later Midland-Swan and Midland-Guildford), and was responsible for the improvement of the Midland Oval for the use of both the cricket and football team. The scoreboard at the ground is named after Watts. Watts played for the cricket club for over thirty years, and as late as the 1927–28 season, when he took a five-wicket haul against North Fremantle at the age of 55, with help from a sticky wicket.

Watts was also a noted player of Australian rules football for the Midland Junction Football Club, playing alongside several of his sons. He played his final game, against  on 5 August 1916, at the age of 44 years and 49 days, making him the oldest person to play senior football in the West Australian Football League (WAFL). He had been called out of retirement for one final game due to a player shortage at the club caused by a large number of players enlisting in the military. Watts and another "old-timer", Dick Hardie, replaced two of Watts' sons, Frederick and Albert, who were injured, in the team. In December 1917, Watts enlisted in the Australian Army, and was made a 2nd Corporal in the 5th Australian Broad Gauge Railway Company. He returned in 1919 and was discharged on 25 June 1919. After retiring from the Railway Workshops, Watts invented and patented a number of track devices, including for a universal movement switch. He also represented the Midland-Guildford Cricket Club on the Western Australian Cricket Association (WACA), and served on a number of committees. Watts died in July 1946 at his home in Midland. Watts was married to Alice, had nine sons and three daughters. Five of his sons played First Grade cricket, and another three played senior football. Albert Watts, one of his sons, captained  for four seasons, and captained Western Australia in eight matches. Two of his granddaughters later married Laurie Bandy and Ted Tyson, both noted sportsmen during the 1930s and 1940s.

References

1872 births
1946 deaths
Australian blacksmiths
Australian cricketers
20th-century Australian inventors
Australian military personnel of World War I
Cricketers from Adelaide
Imperials Football Club players
Midland Junction Football Club players
Sportsmen from Western Australia
Australian rules footballers from Perth, Western Australia